Peter Weidenbaum (born 25 July 1968, Antwerp, Belgium) is a Belgian artist.

It is impossible to categorize Weidenbaum's work using minor stylistic details or constants. It is more of an investigation of our culture of pictures and the manifestation of ideas through art. We use our brains to look. His investigation into images, whether they appear in sculpture, an installation, or paintings on canvas, begins here. Weidenbaum's art is an opposition to reality's rule and a search for the metaphysical.

Education

He became acquainted with painting at a very early age. He maintains that the confrontation with Jean Fouquet's painting "Madonna surrounded by seraphim and cherubim" at the Museum of Fine Arts (Antwerp) altered his view on reality.

In 1993, Weidenbaum enrolled in the Royal Academy in Antwerp and, at the behest of Walter Villain, he studied Monumental Art. During his time there, he sought inspiration from the literature of Sartre, Goethe and Jung. This led to the series "Greetings from Faust" and a string of works by the poet Paul van Ostaijen. The German expressionists Max Beckmann and George Grosz had a significant influence on the young artist. In 2014 the public broadcast service showed a two-series documentary concerning the 350th anniversary of the Royal Academy of Fine Arts in Antwerp (KASK). In "Stream of Talent," such diverse artists like Fred Bervoets, Jan Fabre, Luk Tuymans, Cindy Wright and Peter Weidenbaum reminisce about their time at the KASK.

Situating and work

In 1996, at the suggestion of artist Guillaume Bijl, Weidenbaum successfully applied for a training course at the Higher Institute for Fine Arts (HISK). His investigations into images led to a cross-pollination between cartoon films and sculptural work. In 1999 he received an invitation from Stijn Huijts, director of the Civic Museum "Het Domein" in Sittard, The Netherlands. This results in his first museum exhibition with the installation "Somebody puts something in my dreams." During this period, Weidenbaum also produces a few "fake reality" short films in which his brother plays the lead role. After his HISK period, he works for three years on a series "Out of the Forest," a set of cryptic sculptures, drawings, and paintings.  During this period, Weidenbaum strikes up a close contact with the philosopher Willem Elias, who remarks the following about the series: "Weidenbaum reflects about the world surrounding him. He takes us into the forest. No jolly walkabout but bewitched approaches confuse our sight." In his book "Aspects of Belgian art beyond ‘45", he later cites Weidenbaum under the heading of "neosymbolism," a particular style in Flanders labeled as "the school of Antwerp" and of which Luc Tuymans is the most prominent representative. Elias mentions "recontextualization" of reality and includes Weidenbaum in his book, besides the likes of Ronny Delrue and Koen van den Broek.

Weidenbaum continues to reflect about the function of the artist and reaches the conclusion that an artist as merely a producer of work doesn't make much sense if there is no social dimension connected with it. This is because the artist through his work illustrates a different vision of reality and because of this enriches the spectator's experience.

Exhibitions

With the display "Daswald," Antwerp 2004 and the project "Lookout," Tienen 2005, he emerges from creative isolation. The "Lookout" project involves the construction of a hunting pulpit with students from a technical college. The shooting platform is constructed to a very high standard and placed in a pedestrianized shopping street. This project conducts in close collaboration with the writer, the curator, the artist, the students who help him build the hunting pulpit, the spectator. On the other hand, the different locations: the pedestrianized shopping street, the gallery, and the museum. Weidenbaum interacts and tears them out of their context. The students constructing the hunting pulpit with him, become part of his artistic process. He extracts their activity out of the school structure and involves them in his creative activity. Curator Sven Vanderstichelen has this to say about the "lookout out of the box": "the ‘lookout’ project is not merely an installation, a video, a sketch or a painting. It's a search for what Peter Weidenbaum so aptly names as ‘the inner forest.' The place where every interactive process between the outside world and the self is getting interpreted."

In 2006, at the request of Het Beschrijf, Weidenbaum collaborated on an artistic project "Poëzie" in the city of Brussels. Using the title 'Passing by,' Peter Weidenbaum develops a multifaceted symbolism that corresponds to his artistic expression. He describes his intervention as an infiltration in the Montgomery district and creates a walking route where his paintings of recognizable city scenes are shown in surprising locations. It demonstrates the picture of a dignitary in a night shop and a painting of an independent immigrant in the embassy. This provides food for thought for the inhabitants of the district. He publishes a newspaper where the painted cityscapes show in combination with a poem by Agnieszka Kuciak, a Polish poet and different interviews with local inhabitants. This congruence of systems of signs finalizes with a sculpture on Montgomery Square. He designs a very high lifeguard chair in stainless steel on a concrete slab in which one may read a poem of Kuciak. This is a symbolic gesture, where Weidenbaum invites the accidental passer-by to view the city from a bird's eye view, to reflect, to take distance, to integrate a moment of peace.

Weidenbaum becomes very impressed with the work of the German artist Martin Kippenberger who will have a lasting influence on him through his controversial work.

Another remarkable Weidenbaum work is the artistic alter ego of the car. This damaged bronze vehicle, transformed by the artist into a sculptural aesthetic form is full of references. Transformed into an immobile piece of art, the euphoria of speed puts into question, and only the metaphor remains. For some, it is a status symbol, for others an extension of their ego, which gives them the illusion of freedom and individuality. (Flor Bex, Honorary Director MUHKA about "alter ego").

In 2006 Weidenbaum commences a series of paintings named "Out of the series Car Crash." This results in the monumental sculpture "Alter Ego" in 2008.

It is at that time that the artist begins producing artistic integrations within the architecture of public buildings. 'Green Velvet' in the Children's Psychiatric wing of the UZ Jette and 'Landscape' in Saint Agatha Berchem, in a children's day car center are both good examples of this. In both works, several universes intermingle. An abstracted landscape reconstructs in a public space. In a very urbanized environment, this becomes a landmark, an oasis for young residents.

Weidenbaum attaches particular importance to a society-oriented creative process. He tries to overcome a contemporary feeling such as alienation using pictures: a common reality whereby the object itself lowers the threshold. The permanent installation "Passing-By" at Montgomery in Brussels and his sculpture "Alter Ego" create within this context.

Collections

Work by the artist is held in the public collections of Provincie Flemish Brabant Sculptuur 'Alter Ego' / UZ Jette Integratie 'Green Velvet / Brussels Hoofdstedelijk Gewest Sculptuur 'Passing By' Montgomery / Brusselse Hoofdstedelijke Regering Painting 'Rotation' / Vlaamse Gemeenschapscommissie (VGC), Painting 'Reconcideration' / Stedelijk museum het Domein Sittard Nederland, Sculptuur 'Somebody puts something in my dreams'.

Articles

Willem Elias, 2016, Een ontmoeting met zichzelf en de zijnen, p. 68-71, Staalkaart #32, Staalkaart vzw, Puurs, Belgium
Joannes Késenne, 2016, Een filosoof onder schilders, p. 15, H art No. 151, Idecom media, Antwerp, Belgium
Arne Rombouts, 2013, Docu. Vrt Stroom van talent, Brussels, Belgium
Willem Elias, 2012, Aspecten van de Belgische kunst na '45

References

External links
 Visual Arts Flanders / Kunstenpunt / BAM
 :File:Passing by, Artistic integration,Montgomery Square Brussels.jpg

1968 births
Living people
21st-century Belgian male artists
21st-century Belgian painters
Royal Academy of Fine Arts (Antwerp) alumni